A Sort of Homecoming may refer to:

 "A Sort of Homecoming" (song), 1984 U2 song
 A Sort of Homecoming (album), 2004 Dream Theater album
 A Sort of Homecoming (film), 2015 film
 Bono & The Edge: A Sort of Homecoming, With Dave Letterman, a 2023 television documentary film